Lars Sørensen (November 26, 1905 – 1987) was a Norwegian newspaper editor and politician in Drammen.

Sørensen was born in Oslo, Norway. He graduated from Norwegian Institute of Technology in 1929. He was an electrical engineer by education, and also a nephew of Nils Mikael Raknerud (1881–1937), editor in the newspapers Drammens Tidende og Buskerud Blad. He was a journalist at Drammen Tidende and Buskerud Blad 1934–1937.  In 1937, following the death of  Raknerud,  he succeeded as editor-in-chief of both newspapers.  He stepped down in 1945, only to return for a second period from 1961 to 1977.

Sørensen served as a board member in the Drammen department of the Norwegian Engineering Association 1937–1941. He was a member of Drammen city council from 1936 to 1945, except for a period from 1940 to 1945 during the Nazi German occupation of Norway. He later returned as a councilman from 1951 to 1971. From 1964 he was a member of Buskerud county council.

References

1905 births
1987 deaths
Engineers from Oslo
20th-century Norwegian engineers
Norwegian Institute of Technology alumni
Politicians from Drammen
Norwegian newspaper editors
20th-century Norwegian writers